Vice-Admiral Kulakov is an  of the Russian Navy. As of 2022, the ship was in active service. She is named after Soviet naval officer Nikolai Kulakov.

History 

Vice-Admiral Kulakov was commissioned in December 1981 and was in service with the Northern Fleet until March 1991, when she was retired for repairs that lasted more than 18 years. The ship travelled to Severomorsk base on 7 December 2010 in preparation for the vessel's return to active duty.
On 5 January 2011, a fire broke out in one of the ship's mess-rooms. It was reported to be caused by a short circuit. The damage was minimal and did not reduce the combat effectiveness of the ship.

On 3 September 2011 the destroyer conducted the first underway landings tests for the new Ka-52K helicopter.

In 2012 the destroyer escorted commercial convoys as part of the anti-piracy mission in the Gulf of Aden. In July 2012, Vice-Admiral Kulakov led a flotilla of the Northern Fleet to the Eastern Mediterranean to conduct naval drills, close to the Syrian coast. In August 2012 she paid a five-day visit to Portsmouth Naval Base, England. In September 2012 Vice-Admiral Kulakov visited Cobh, Ireland.

Vice-Admiral Kulakov was part of the 70th anniversary commemorations of the Battle of the Atlantic in Liverpool, England in May 2013.

In April 2014, a British destroyer, was deployed to waters north of Scotland to track Vice-Admiral Kulakov as the destroyer sailed near the United Kingdom amid heightened tensions between Russia and the UK.

In 2016, she was sent to the eastern Mediterranean, to back the air campaign in Syria and fly the flag  In March 2016, as she and supporting Russian ships entered the United Kingdom's exclusive economic zone, they were intercepted and escorted by the British frigate .

In 2020, it was reported that she would be upgraded to the standard of the recently refitted Marshal Shaposhnikov. On 8 June 2020, Vice-Admiral Kulakov entered the Barents Sea to conduct anti-submarine exercises. Afterwards, she sailed to Kronstadt to participate in the Navy day parade on 26 July. Accompanied by tanker Akademik Pashin and tug Altay, she then entered the Mediterranean Sea and paid several port visits. Between 11–13 August she visited Algeria, between 30 August–2 September Cyprus, between 19–22 October Greece and on 1 November Syria. The ship detachment was commanded by the Chief of staff of the brigade of anti-submarine ships of the Northern Fleet Captain 1st rank Stanislav Varik. On her way to the homeport, the ship passed Pas-de-Calais on 14 November, entered the Barents Sea on 8 December and returned to homeport Severomorsk on 10 December, where the ship detachment was greeted by the commander of the Northern Fleet Aleksandr Moiseyev.

In 2021, Vice-Admiral Kulakov was deployed to the Mediterranean Sea and, afterwards, the Gulf of Guinea along with tanker Akademik Pashin and tug Altay, where on 25 October, the destroyer freed the container ship Lucia sailing under Panamanian flag from Togo to Cameroon that came under attack of pirates. On the way back, the destroyer monitored large-scale NATO naval exercise in the Norwegian Sea with two Norwegian frigates, four corvettes, two submarines and other ships, as well as a German, French, Danish and Portuguese frigate.

On 7 February 2022, as part of a concentration of Russian naval forces in the Mediterranean, Vice-Admiral Kulakov again deployed to the Mediterranean, along with the cruiser Marshal Ustinov, frigate  and tanker Vyazma. The destroyer departed the Mediterranean on 24 August 2022 ostensibly destined for its home base Severomorsk.

References 

Udaloy-class destroyers
1980 ships
Destroyers of the Russian Navy
Cold War destroyers of the Soviet Union
Ships built in the Soviet Union
Russian involvement in the Syrian civil war
Ships built at Severnaya Verf